Sadkowo may refer to the following places in Poland:
Sadkowo, Masovian Voivodeship
Sadkowo, West Pomeranian Voivodeship
Sądkowo, West Pomeranian Voivodeship